This is a list of Irish military installations occupied by the Defence Forces (including Army, Air Corps, Naval Service and Reserve Defence Forces) in the Republic of Ireland by province and overseas.

The Irish Defence Forces maintains approximately 20,000 acres of land for military training in the state.

Connacht
Oranmore Rifle Range, County Galway	 
Renmore Barracks, Renmore, County Galway
RDF Clifden, County Galway
RDF Boyle, County Roscommon
Carnagh Rifle Range, County Roscommon
RDF Sligo, County Sligo

Leinster

Cathal Brugha Barracks, Rathmines, Dublin	
McKee Barracks, Blackhorse Avenue, Dublin	
St Bricin's Military Hospital, Dublin 7	
Casement Aerodrome, Baldonnel, County Dublin	
Esplanade Collins Barracks, Dublin
DFTC, Curragh Camp, County Kildare
Department of Defence Headquarters, Station Road, Newbridge, County Kildare
Stephens Barracks, County Kilkenny
RDF Portlaoise, County Laois
Aiken Barracks, Dundalk, County Louth	
Red Barn Rifle Range, Dundalk, County Louth
Gormanston Camp and Aerodrome, County Meath
RDF Navan, County Meath	 
Custume Barracks, Athlone, County Westmeath
Military Barracks Wexford, County Wexford
Glen of Imaal, County Wicklow
Kilbride Camp and Rifle Range, County Wicklow 
Coolmoney Camp, County Wicklow	 
Rockbrae House Bray, County Wicklow	 
Range Warden's Post, Seskin, County Wicklow

Munster

Knockalisheen, County Clare
RDF Premises Ennis, County Clare
Lynch Camp Kilworth, County Cork		 
Bere Island, County Cork		 
Naval Base, Haulbowline, County Cork		 
Fort Davis, Whitegate, County Cork		 
Fort Templebreedy, Crosshaven, County Cork		 
Collins Barracks, County Cork		 
Fermoy Barracks, County Cork		 
RDF Kilcrohane, County Cork
RDF Skibbereen, County Cork		 
RDF Mallow, County Cork
Ballymullen Barracks Tralee, County Kerry
Fort Shannon, Tarbert, County Kerry 
RDF Premises Killorglin, County Kerry
Sarsfield Barracks, County Limerick 	 
Military Barracks Nenagh, County Tipperary
McCan Barracks, Templemore, County Tipperary
Kilcoran Rifle Range, County Tipperary
Military Barracks Waterford, County Waterford

Ulster
Finner Camp, County Donegal
RDF Letterkenny, County Donegal
RDF Cavan, County Cavan

Former
Connolly Barracks, County Longford Closed 2009
Castlebar Military Barracks, Castlebar, County Mayo Closed 2012
Columb Barracks, Mullingar, County Westmeath Closed 2012
Ballymullen Barracks Tralee, County Kerry

Overseas

Camp Shamrock, United Nations Post 2-45, At Tiri, Lebanon
United Nations Post 6-52, Maroun al-Ras, Lebanon
Camp Faouar, Syria
United Nations Post 80, Al-Rafid, Syria

References

Military of the Republic of Ireland
Department of Defence (Ireland)

Irish military bases
 
Irish Air Corps bases
Ireland-related lists